The Lyric Theatre, or simply The Lyric, is the principal, full-time producing theatre in Belfast, Northern Ireland.

The theatre's current Executive Producer is Jimmy Fay, previously the founder and Artistic Director of Bedrock Productions.

History
The theatre was first established as The Lyric Players in 1951 at the home of its founders Mary O'Malley and her husband Pearse in Derryvolgie Avenue, off the Malone Road, and moved to its new site on Ridgeway Street in 1968, between the Stranmillis Road and Stranmillis Embankment. Austin Clarke laid the foundation stone in 1965 a deliberate choice by O'Malley to build a link back to her artistic hero W. B. Yeats.

In 1974 the theatre staged Andrew Lloyd Webber's Jesus Christ Superstar, leading to protests. In 1976 Liam Neeson appeared in Brian Friel's Philadelphia Here I Come!. Neeson's association with the Lyric has continued since, and he is currently the theatre's patron. Several of Friel's plays have been staged at the theatre, including Dancing at Lughnasa in 1996 and 2015. A number of Marie Jones plays have been staged there including A Very Weird Manor.

In 2004 the theatre announced a fundraising campaign to redevelop the theatre on its existing site. In June 2007 a £1m donation by Northern Irish businessman Dr Martin Naughton kickstarted the development. Naughton's donation was the largest in Northern Ireland arts history. He had previously made donations to Queen's University, where the Naughton Gallery is named in his honour.

New Lyric Theatre 
The new theatre, designed by O'Donnell & Tuomey, opened on 1 May 2011, with a Gala Performance of The Crucible. The new facility features a new main theatre with a seating capacity of almost 400 and a multi-function performance space 'The Naughton Studio' which can seat between 120 and 170. This new theatre was an almost threefold increase in the size of the previous building and the theatre remains the largest employer of actors and other theatre professionals in the region.

The Lyric's current Chair is Sir Bruce Robinson who took over in January 2015 from BBC Northern Ireland journalist Mark Carruthers, who received an OBE at Buckingham Palace on 25 March 2011, in recognition of his leadership of the theatre at a highly critical time in its development.

Since the theatre re-opened a permanent exhibition of the work of Belfast-born visual artist Colin Davidson (artist) has been on display at the theatre where he personally presented his work to Her Majesty Queen Elizabeth II and the President of Ireland during the Royal visit to Northern Ireland on 27 June 2012. This was the occasion, and the Lyric was the chosen site, for a public meeting between Queen Elizabeth II and Martin McGuinness, Deputy First Minister for the Northern Ireland Assembly and a former commander of the IRA. The event is viewed by many as a positive sign for the ongoing peace process in Northern Ireland.

In October 2018, as part of the theatre's 50th anniversary on the Stranmillis site, that theme of being "a shared place, a crossroads between communities" was marked at a symposium and over a weekend of celebratory events with the Irish Times noting the Lyric was a cultural bridge in a divided city.

Controversy
A Stormont investigation found that there were serious failing in the selection of a preferred bidder for the new Lyric Theatre building. The report stated that the way in which the contract was awarded was significantly flawed and failed to adhere to principles of good practice. Chairwoman of the Public Accounts Committee Michaela Boyle said: "The quality of the rebuilt Lyric Theatre is undisputed; we recognise that it is a highly impressive theatre and that it has deservedly won a number of prestigious awards. However, the end does not justify the means. My committee has found that there were significant departures from good practice."

A year after Stormont's PAC reported, then finance minister Simon Hamilton suggested that if the committee had actually found evidence of fraud the people they should be speaking to are the PSNI, not the BBC and that the committee had "slurred organisations and individuals."

Productions
 Romeo and Juliet, 2022, by  William Shakespeare, adapted by Anne Bailie
 Propoganda, 2022, by Conor Mitchell
 Rough Girls, 2021, by Tara Lynne O'Neill it was later filmed for BBC Four
 The Border Game, 2021 (with 2022 remount), by Michael Patrick and Oisín Kearney (with Prime Cut Productions)
 Crocodile Fever, 2019, by Meghan Tyler (with Traverse Theatre)
 The Alternative, 2019, by Michael Patrick and Oisín Kearney
 Here Comes The Night, 2016, by Rosemary Jenkinson
 Smiley, 2016, by Gary Mitchell
 Death of a Comedian, 2015, by Owen McCafferty (with Abbey Theatre and Soho Theatre)
 Demented, 2014, by Gary Mitchell
 Mistletoe & Crime, 2014, by Marie Jones
 Can't Forget About You, 2013, by David Ireland (with Tron Theatre)
 Love, Billy, 2013, by Graham Reid
 The Man Jesus, 2013, by Matthew Hurt
 Molly Wobbly's T*t Factory, 2012, by Paul Boyd
 The Civilisation Game, 2012, by Tim Loane
 White Star of the North 2012, by Rosemary Jenkinson
 The Absence of Women, 2010, by Owen McCafferty
Santa Claus .. What the Reindeer Saw, 2008
 To Be Sure, 2007, by Tim Loane
 1974, 2006, by Damian Gorman
 Merry Christmas Betty Ford, 2005, by Conor Mitchell
 The Snow Queen, 2005, by Hans Christian Andersen, adapted by Richard Croxford
 A Very Weird Manor, 2005, by Marie Jones
 Paradise, 2004, by Alan McKee
 McCool XXL, 2002, by Paul Boyd
 Marching On, 2000, by Gary Mitchell
 The Butterfly of Killybegs, 2000, by Brian Foster
 Alice's Adventures in Wonderland, 1998, by Paul Boyd
 Getting the Picture, 1998, by David Pownall
 Tearing the Loom, 1998, by Gary Mitchell
 To Hell with Faust", 1998, by Zoë Seaton
 Drive On!, 1996, by Bill Morrison
 The Desert Lullaby: A Play in Two Acts, 1996, by Jennifer Johnston
 Lengthening Shadows, 1995, by Graham Reid
 Hidden Curriculum (revival), 1994, by Graham Reid
 Galloping Buck Jones, 1994, by Ken Bourke (playwright)
 Pictures of Tomorrow, 1994, by Martin Lynch
 The Private Picture Show, 1994, by Owen McCafferty
 How Many Miles to Babylon?, 1993, 2014, by Jennifer Johnston
 Round the Big Clock, 1992, by John Boyd
 Pygmies in the Ruins, 1991, by Ron Hutchinson
 Rough Beginnings, 1991, by Robert Ellison
 Charlie Gorilla, 1989, by John McClelland
 The Belle of Belfast City, 1989, by Christina Reid
 Culture Vultures, 1988, by Robin Glendinning
 Summer Class, 1986, by John Boyd
 Minstrel Boys, 1985, by Martin Lynch
 Northern Star, 1984, by Stewart Parker
 Remembrance, 1984, by Graham Reid
 Castles in the Air, 1983, by Martin Lynch
 Indian Summer, 1983, by Jennifer Johnston
 Tea in a China Cup, 1983, by Christina Reid
 Kingdom Come, 1982, by Stewart Parker
 Speranza's Boy, 1982, by John Boyd
 The Interrogation of Ambrose Fogarty, 1982, by Martin Lynch
 Dockers, 1981, by Martin Lynch
 My Silver Bird, 1981, by Patrick Galvin
 Old Days, 1981, by Frank Dunne
 Victims, 1981, by Eugene McCabe it was later filmed for RTÉ
 Dark Rosaleen, 1980, by Vincent Mahon
 Facing North, 1979, by John Boyd
 Európé, 1978, by Dominic Behan
 The Rise and Fall of Barney Kerrigan, 1977, by Frank Dunne
 The Street, 1977, by John Boyd
 The Rise and Fall of Barney Kerrigan, 1977 by Frank Dunne
 It Would Be Funny..., 1975, by Tom Coffey (playwright)
 Guests, 1974, by John Boyd
 We Do It For Love, 1974, by Patrick Galvin
 The Last Burning, 1974 by Patrick Galvin
 Nightfall to Belfast, 1973, by Patrick Galvin
 The Farm, 1972, by John Boyd
 The Lads, 1972, by Joe O'Donnell
 The Flats (Belfast 1971), 1971, (1984) by John Boyd
 Lá Fhéile Míchíl, 1963, by Eoghan Ó Tuairisc
 Happy as Larry'', 1947, by Donagh MacDonagh, staged at Dublin's Abbey Theatre

References

External links

 

Theatres in Belfast